Mesophractias is a genus of moths of the family Noctuidae. The genus was described by Warren in 1913.

Species
Mesophractias alstoni (Hampson, 1907) Sri Lanka
Mesophractias falcatalis (Hampson, 1894) Sikkim in India

References

Acontiinae